Bomma Borusa is a 1971 Indian Telugu-language comedy film directed by K. Balachander.
It is a remake of the Tamil film Poova Thalaiya, directed by K. Balachander himself. The film stars Rama Krishna, Chandra Mohan, S. Varalakshmi, Chalam, Vennira Aadai Nirmala, Allu Ramalingaiah, Mukkamala, Raja Babu and Ramaprabha.
It was produced by Avichi Meiyappa Chettiar and distributed by AVM Productions. The film music was composed by R. Goverdhanam and lyrics were written by Kosaraju Raghavaiah.

Plot 

It is an old classical family drama. Sundaram (Ramakrishna) is a rich businessman and he has an younger brother Sekhar (Chandra Mohan), a college going guy who loves his brother so much. Sundaram's mother-in-law Parvatham (S. Varalakshmi) who cares for his assets, shows her dominating character on Sekhar and Sundaram. She bets with Sekhar that she would separate him from his brother and puts some conditions that he should not tell his brother about the bet to prove his strength. Parvatham's second son-in-law (Chalam) identifies that his mother-in-law has moved to Sundaram's house. Soon the second son-in-law comes to the house and places a bet with Parvatham that she only should reveal that he is the son-in-law of her. Since then, both of them start proving their capacity to win the bet. The film revolves around who wins the bet and how it brings about a change in Parvathamma's beliefs.

Cast

Soundtrack 
 "Vesukunta Chempalu Vesukunta" (male)
 "Vesukunta Chempalu Vesukunta" (female)
 "Bomma Borusa Pandem Veyyi Needo Naado Paicheyi"
 "Vallu Jhillan Tunnadi"
 "Sarile Pove Vagaladi"
Soundtrack for this Telugu film was composed by R. Goverdhanam and lyrics were written by Kosaraju Raghavaiah.

References

External links 
 
 Bomma Borusa at Open Movie Database
 Bomma Borusa at CITWF
  Bomma Borusa at Chak Pak
  Bomma Borusa at Spice
 Bomma Borusa at Hollywood Upclose
 Bomma Borusa at Film Web

1971 films
Telugu remakes of Tamil films
Films directed by K. Balachander
Films with screenplays by K. Balachander
AVM Productions films
1970s Telugu-language films